Mayadevi Rural Municipality may refer to:
Mayadevi Rural Municipality, Rupandehi; a rural municipality in Rupandehi District of Nepal
Mayadevi Rural Municipality, Kapilvastu; a rural municipality in Kapilvastu District of Nepal